Gassy  is a village in the administrative district of Gmina Konstancin-Jeziorna, within Piaseczno County, Masovian Voivodeship, in east-central Poland.

In 2014 ferry to Karczew started service. According to people working on this project the main problem was official "no-entry" car, despite road there. Without cars it was not economically reasonable, and after this problem was solved by removing rule, the ferry started.

References

Gassy